Sunrise Mall may refer to:

Sunrise Mall (Brownsville, Texas)
Sunrise Mall (Corpus Christi), Texas
Sunrise Mall (Citrus Heights, California)
Sunrise Mall (Massapequa Park, New York), known as Westfield Sunrise from 2005-2020, Massapequa, New York
The Galleria at Fort Lauderdale, formerly the Sunrise Center, Fort Lauderdale, Florida